The John Maddox Prize is an international prize administered by Sense about Science in partnership with Nature. One or two individuals are recognised annually by the Prize for their work promoting sound science and evidence despite hostility. The prize was started in 2012 in commemoration of John Maddox, former editor-in-chief of Nature, who was distinguished in his advancement of science for the public interest. His daughter, Bronwen Maddox, is the current patron of the Prize. Winners receive a monetary award and an announcement is published in Nature. As of 2023, Nature has withdrawn their funding for the prize.

Recipients
There have been 13 John Maddox Prize winners since its inception in 2012.

2012
In 2012, the John Maddox Prize was awarded to British psychiatrist Simon Wessely and Chinese science writer Shi-min Fang. Wessely was recognised for continuing his research on Myalgic Encaphalomyelitis/Chronic Fatigue Syndrome despite criticism from patient groups, and Fang was recognised for his work exposing pseudoscience and fraud as a popular science writer in China. There have been objections to Wessely being awarded the prize, however, due to concerns about his quality of research.

2013
In 2013, British Neuropsychopharmacologist David Nutt was awarded the John Maddox Prize for his influence on the evidence-based classification of drugs in the UK and elsewhere. He had faced adversity such as dismissal from his government position on the Advisory Council on the Misuse of Drugs.

2014
In 2014, the John Maddox Prize was awarded to US writer and journalist Emily Willingham and Irish physicist and science writer David Robert Grimes. Both winners are science writers who have communicated difficult science topics to the public despite intense criticism, and in Willingham's case, legal action.

2015
In 2015, University of Exeter academic physician Edzard Ernst and University of Oxford nutrition scientist Susan Jebb shared the John Maddox Prize. Ernst was awarded for applying evidence-based methodologies to research in complementary and alternative medicines, and for communicating this research despite severe hostility. Jebb was awarded for her work to promote evidence in public understandings of nutrition in the face of criticism and false claims of industry funding.

2016 
Cognitive psychologist Elizabeth Loftus was awarded the 2016 John Maddox Prize for persistence in researching and communicating the evidence behind false memory.

2017
In 2017, Japanese doctor and journalist Riko Muranaka won the John Maddox Prize for her work countering misinformation about the HPV vaccine with science and evidence,  despite hostility including legal suits.

2018
In 2018, an early-career researcher John Maddox Prize was awarded to former naturopath Britt Hermes for promoting evidence-based medicine. Marine biologist Terry Hughes was also awarded the John Maddox Prize for his work documenting coral reef decline despite lawsuits and death threats.

2020
2020's prize was awarded, for communicating the science behind COVID-19, to Anthony Fauci, Director of the National Institute of Allergy and Infectious Diseases (NIAID), and Salim S. Abdool Karim, director of the Centre for the AIDS Programme of Research in South Africa. Anne Abbott, a neurologist from the Central Clinical School at Monash University in Melbourne, Australia was awarded the early career prize for her perseverance in challenging unnecessary procedural treatment of carotid stenosis, which can lead to strokes.

2021
The 2021 prize was awarded to Elisabeth Bik  for "outstanding work exposing widespread threats to research integrity in scientific papers". Mohammad Sharif Razai, from St George's, University of London, was awarded the early career prize for his work "tackling racial health inequalities; from vaccine hesitancy among ethnic minority groups, to revealing systemic racism as a fundamental cause and driver of adverse health outcomes".

References 

Scientific research awards
Science communication awards
2012 establishments